Giovanni Rucellai may refer to:

Giovanni di Paolo Rucellai (1403–1481), Renaissance writer and patron of the arts
Giovanni di Bernardo Rucellai (1475–1525), his grandson, Renaissance writer and humanist

See also
Bernardo Rucellai (1448/49–1514), son of Giovanni di Paolo Rucellai and father of Giovanni di Bernardo Rucellai